Garin, Warin, Guarin, Guarino (Italian), or Garí (Catalan) is a name and may refer to:
Guarin, 12th-century Siculo-Norman chancellor
Garin de Monglane, legendary warrior
Garin d'Apchier, inventor of the descort
Garin lo Brun, troubadour
See The Hyperboloid of Engineer Garin for Engineer Garin, a fictional engineer from Aleksei Tolstoy's book
Garin, Haute-Garonne, a commune in southern France
Garin de Montaigu, 13th Grand Master of the Knights Hospitaller
Garin Veris, American football defensive end
Garin Cecchini, baseball player
Garin Morgan, Civil Engineer, South Africa

See also
Garin (surname)
Garin (disambiguation)